Blerim Hasalla (born 13 September 1976) is an Albanian retired football defender who played most of his career for Lushnja in the Albanian First Division.

Honours

Besa 
 Albanian Cup (1): 2009–10

References

1976 births
Living people
Association football defenders
Albanian footballers
KS Lushnja players
KF Skënderbeu Korçë players
Luftëtari Gjirokastër players
Besa Kavajë players
FK Tomori Berat players
Kategoria Superiore players
Kategoria e Parë players